This is a list of members of the South Australian Legislative Council between 1989 and 1993. As half of the Legislative Council's terms expired at each state election, half of these members were elected at the 1985 state election with terms expiring in 1993, while the other half were elected at the 1989 state election with terms expiring in 1997.

 Liberal MLC Martin Cameron resigned on 31 August 1990. Bernice Pfitzner was appointed to the casual vacancy on 23 October 1990.

References

 "Statistical Record of the Legislature, 1837–2007", Parliament of South Australia, 2007.
 "History of South Australian Elections, 1857–2006", Dean Jaensch, 2006.

Members of South Australian parliaments by term
20th-century Australian politicians